Bartolomé Sanchez, better known as Bartus Bartolomes, is an artist born in 1950 in the town of Pregonero, the state of Táchira in Venezuela. He is currently based in Italy and France. Bartus creates using a wide range of mediums, including painting, drawing, caricature, photography, design, and even poetry. In 1969 he wrote "Kitsch Art", a manifesto promoting street artistic experimentalism.

Life and education
Upon completing his secondary education at Colegio de la Salle in the city of San Cristóbal in Venezuela, where he held his first exhibition of paintings when he was 17 years old, Bartus traveled to Europe and lived in Paris from 1968 until 1974, participating in the student movement that generated the Mai 68, and attended the École Normale Supérieure, the École des Beaux Arts and the University of Vincennes, Paris VIII.

His family owned the Sanchez Pernia Estate, one of the largest coffee plantations in the country covering more than 90,000 hectares from 1898 up to the 1960s. However, the newly emerging governments from the 1960s began to expropriate the land.

In the expropriated lands, the government promoted and built the Uribante Caparo Hydroelectric Dam, a project that became detrimental to the eco-systems of three Venezuelan states: Táchira, Mérida and Barinas, decreasing the productivity of the traditionally cultivated areas, affecting the rivers, local plants and bird migrations because this area was a pathway or transit corridor used by migrating birds.

These expropriations and the negative effect they had on the environment he grew up in affected Bartus. He devoted his creativity to establishing links between art and water, and he promoted cultural events that highlight the consequences of human intervention on the environment such as environmental pollution and global warming.

In the early 1970s he published a new manifesto in San Francisco proclaiming a Transpositionism; a search on new proposals as symbolic calligraphy, haiku and visual art from which he proposed the new denomination Graphi-kú, a combination between Haiku and Graphic.

In the mid-1970s he obtained a degree in International Studies (Diplomacy) from the Central University in Caracas.

In the late 1970s and early 1980s he was involved with the group Zeta International promoters of the New Visuality or Poesia Visiva with Carlo Marcello Conti, Lamberto Pignotti, Adriano Spatola, Gerard Jaschke, Eugenio Miccini, Luciana Arbizzani, T. Blittersdorf, Graziella Borghesi, Erio sughi among many others.

In the mid-1980s, linked to a diplomatic post, he lived in India and China. He exhibited work in New Delhi. Later he studied calligraphy in Beijing, China, and Bantu art in Libreville, Gabon, Central Africa.

Bartus returned to Europe in the mid-1990s and began his project on Global Rights of drinkable water, looking to motivate the international community in the creation of large water caves to fill in periods of drought at 65 countries experiencing shortages of fresh water seasonally and with more intensity in recent years by the failure of most governments International Agreements both in the area of Sustainable Development as the environment from Kyoto Treaty.

Work

As told by French writer Gérard-Georges Lemaire: 

Carlo Marcello Conti, art critic, writes:

Exhibitions
Bartus Bartolomes has participated in numerous exhibitions:

2011 

 Giants in the City, Monumental Sculpture Project, Bayfront Park, Miami, United States.
 Arte Padova 22ª Edizione. Padua, Italy.
 World Monuments Fund Gallery, New York City, United States.
 Latinamente Primo Piano LivinGallery. Lecce, Italy.
 Art Verona Art Fair. Verona, Italy.
 Art Platform Art Fair. Los Angeles, United States.

2012 

 The Office Contemporary Art Gallery, Rome, Italy.
 13th Annual day of the Dead Exhibition at SomArts Cultural Center. San Francisco, United States
 Graffito International Art Exhibition. Miami, United States
 One Hundred Twenty Eight Gallery. Lower East Village, New York City, United States
 YAA Museum Broward County Library. Miami, United States
 Kavachnina Contemporary Art Gallery, Wynwood, Florida, United States
 Area 24 Art Gallery. Naples, Italy
 BluorG Gallery, Bari, Italy
 Anonymous Gallery/Casa de Empeño Gallery. Mexico City, Mexico
 The Art Link Gallery, Wynwood, Miami, United States.
 Zona Maco. Mexico Arte Contemporaneo. Anonymous Gallery. Mexico
 Arte America. Irreversible Art Projects. Miami Beach Convention Center. Miami, United States
 Museo di Matino. Magliano, Italy
 Burning Man Passport Proposal with Domingo de Lucia. Black Rock City & Desert. Nevada, United States

2013 

 Art Monaco. Monteolivetto Gallery. Nice, France
 Snug Harbor Art Lab. Staten Island, New York, United States
 41st Salon Antibes. & Modern Art Fair. April 20 – May 6. Port Vauban, Antibes, France
 Smart Aix-en-Provence Art Fair. May 2 – May 6. Monteolivetto Gallery. France
 Art of the Prom. June 7–9. Promenade des Anglais, Nice, France
 Ateneo del Táchira. San Cristóbal, Táchira, Venezuela
 Biblioteca Civica di Feltre, Belluno, Italy
 Global Art Gallery. Noicàttaro, Italy
 Miami International Art Fair. Miami, United States
 MIA Encore Aboard Sea Fair. April 4 – April 7. Miami, United States

2014 

 Nest Gen Eco Art Project. Florida International University & Frost Museum Gardens. Miami, United States.
 Art Basel Week, Miami, United States
 PARImageS, Galerie Etienne des Causans & Monteolivetto Gallery. Photography, December. Paris, France
 ART3F MULHOUSE, November 28 – November 30. France
 Premio Napoli per L’Arte Contemporaneo.
 Base Navale Molosiglio. Naples, Italy. & Galleria Monteolivetto; 
 Florida International University. Honors College, Hall. Miami, United States
 Galleria Car

2015 

 Kontempo Art. January. Coral Gables, Miami, United States.
 Fiera di Bologna. Campanotto Art Books. January 28 – February 1. Bologna, Italy
 The Arquitecture of Love Brooklyn Bridge Light Art Project
 Gender Equality Proposal. New Delhi, India
 Art for Water. Itinerary Public Project
 Biennial of Exile and Refugees Art
 DWN TWN Art Days. 4th Annual Celebration. September 11 – September 13. Bayfront Park, Miami, United States.
 Bergamo Arte. November. Bergamo. Italy
 Miami Book Fair. Plunging Ourselves. Indiana, United States
 ICL Studio. December 4 – December 7. Art Week Basel. Wynwood, Miami, United States

Publications

Sushi Poems, 2008.
La Saliva del Gorilla, 2010.
The horns of the rhinoceros, 2011.
Birds Birdy Birding, 2012.
Il diluvio è una cicala con le labbra azzurre, 2012.
Nightmare in New York, 2014.
Plunging Ourselves, 2015.

References

External links

1958 births
Living people
People from Táchira
Venezuelan painters
Venezuelan photographers
École Normale Supérieure alumni